A by-election was held for the New South Wales Legislative Assembly electorate of Wellington on 29 May 1891 because of the death of David Ferguson.

Dates

Candidates
 Michael O'Halloran was the proprietor of the Wellington Times and Australian Industrial Liberator, founded to support the labour movement, and one of the pioneers of the Labour Electoral League, that would become the Labour Party.
 Alexander Riddel was a former minister, proprietor of  the Broken Hill Times, advocate for a single tax, and another of the pioneers of the Labour Electoral League He had previously stood as a Free Trade candidate at the 1889 election for Inverell. 
 Thomas Quirk was the manager of flour mills owned by the former member David Ferguson and was an alderman on the Wellington Council.
 Thomas York was a stock and station agent in Wellington and a former Mayor of Wellington.

Both O'Halloran and Riddel claimed to represent the Labour Party and engaged in a public dispute as to who had been chosen by the unions to represent the workers of Wellington. Antony Green labeled O'Halloran as a Protectionist and Riddel as a Free Trader, which reflects their positions on the fiscal issue, one of the issues which would divide the Labour Party following the 1891 election.

Result

David Ferguson died.

Aftermath
York did not get to take his seat as parliament was prorogued the day after the declaration of the poll, and dissolved on 6 June for a general election. York, Quirk and O'Halloran each contested the election on 20 June, with similar results, York was elected with a slightly increased margin.

See also
Electoral results for the district of Wellington
List of New South Wales state by-elections

References

1891 elections in Australia
New South Wales state by-elections
1890s in New South Wales